Jean-Pierre Denis (born 29 March 1946) is a French film director and screenwriter. He has directed seven films since 1980. His directorial debut Adrien's Story won the Caméra d'Or at the 1980 Cannes Film Festival. His film Field of Honor was entered into the 1987 Cannes Film Festival.

Filmography
 Adrien's Story (1980)
 La palombière (1983)
 Champ d'honneur (1987)
 Les yeux de Cécile (1993)
 Les blessures assassines (2000)
 La petite Chartreuse (2005)
 Ici-bas (2011)

References

External links

1946 births
Living people
French film directors
French film producers
French male screenwriters
French screenwriters
People from Dordogne
20th-century French non-fiction writers
21st-century French non-fiction writers
20th-century French male writers
Directors of Caméra d'Or winners